James Higgins (March 25, 1824 – January 26, 1910) was an Irish-born American farmer from Shields, Wisconsin who spent a single term, in 1876, as a Reform Party member of the Wisconsin State Assembly from Dodge County.

Background 
Higgins was born in County Sligo, Ireland on March 25, 1824. He received a common school education, and became a farmer. He came to Wisconsin in 1851, and settled in the Town of Shields.

Public office 
He had served seven years as chairman of his town, several years as a justice of the peace, and two years (1871-1872) as Dodge County county clerk, when in 1875 he was elected to the Assembly from Dodge County's 6th Assembly district (the Towns of Ashippun, Emmet, Lebanon, and Shields). He received 420 votes as a candidate of the Reform Party (a short-lived coalition of Democrats, reform and Liberal Republicans, and Grangers formed in 1873), against 397 votes for Thomas O'Meara, the regular Democratic nominee (who had run as a "regular Reform" candidate the year before). (Reform incumbent Harman Grube was not a candidate for re-election.) He was assigned to the standing committee on medical societies.

The Assembly was redistricted for the 1877 session (Dodge County went from six seats to four); the new district which included Shields was taken by Democrat Patrick Roche.

Higgins died on January 26, 1910, at the age of 85.

References 

1824 births
1910 deaths
Farmers from Wisconsin
Irish emigrants to the United States (before 1923)
Members of the Wisconsin State Assembly
People from County Sligo
People from Dodge County, Wisconsin
Wisconsin Reformers (19th century)
19th-century American politicians
County clerks in Wisconsin
Wisconsin city council members